Artem Grigoryevich Laguta (born 13 November 1990) is a Russian motorcycle speedway rider and member of the Russian national team. He is the 2021 World Champion.

Career details 
Laguta became the Russian champion in 2010 and 2011. 

In August 2010, during the Speedway Grand Prix Qualification he won the GP Challenge, which ensured that he claimed a permanent slot for the 2011 Grand Prix.

He is also a three times world team champion with Russia after partnering Emil Sayfutdinov during three consecutive years, as Russia won the Speedway of Nations in 2018, 2019 and 2020. In April 2020, he obtained a dual national speedway licence after obtaining a Polish licence, although he continued to represent Russia.

Laguta became the 2021 Individual World Champion after winning the 2021 Speedway Grand Prix with 192 points. He won five rounds out of eleven and overtook defending champion Bartosz Zmarzlik in the points standings in round 10, which proved to be the pivotal moment of the Championship.

In 2022 and 2023, Laguta was unable to defend his world title following the Fédération Internationale de Motocyclisme ban on Russian and Belarusian motorcycle riders, teams, officials, and competitions as a result of the 2022 Russian invasion of Ukraine.

Major results

World individual Championship
2018 Speedway Grand Prix - 6th 
2019 Speedway Grand Prix - 11th
2020 Speedway Grand Prix - 7th (including Wrocław grand prix win)
2021 Speedway Grand Prix - Champion (including Czech Republic, Lublin, Toruń, Russian & Danish grand prix wins)

World team Championships
2010 Speedway World Cup - 6th
2012 Speedway World Cup - 3rd
2016 Speedway World Cup - 6th
2018 Speedway of Nations - Winner
2019 Speedway of Nations - Winner
2020 Speedway of Nations - Winner

World junior championships 
2008 - 4th place in the Qualifying Round 1
2009 -  Goričan - 12th place (4 pts)

European Junior Championships 
2007 -  Częstochowa - 7th place (9 pts)
2008 -  Stralsund - 5th place (10 pts)
2008 - 2nd place in the Semi-Final 2
2009 -  Tarnów - 4th place (13 pts + 3rd in Run-Off)

Domestic competitions 
 Team Polish Championship (League)
 2008 - 5th place in the First League for Daugavpils (Average 1.894)
 2009 - for Daugavpils

Personal life
His brother Grigory is also an international speedway rider and four times Russian champion.

See also 
 Russia national speedway team

References

External links 
 (ru) Riders of Lokomotive Daugavpils

1990 births
Living people
Russian speedway riders
Individual Speedway World Champions
Naturalized citizens of Poland
Sportspeople from Vladivostok